Milton Wolsky (1916–1981) was an American painter and illustrator. Educated in his hometown of Omaha, Nebraska and in Chicago, Illinois, and he worked as a magazine illustrator in New York City in the 1940s-1950s. His work can be seen at the Museum of Nebraska Art and the Joslyn Art Museum.

References

1916 births
1981 deaths
Artists from Omaha, Nebraska
Painters from Nebraska
American magazine illustrators
Deaths from cancer in Nebraska